Sean Adair (born 26 December 1986) is a South African cricketer. He played in 53 first-class, 47 List A, and 4 Twenty20 matches for Eastern Province from 2006 to 2012.

See also
 List of Eastern Province representative cricketers

References

External links
 

1986 births
Living people
South African cricketers
Eastern Province cricketers
Cricketers from Johannesburg